Garoua Airport , also known as Garoua International Airport, is an airport serving Garoua, the capital of North Province, Cameroon.

Airlines and Destinations

References

External links

Airports in Cameroon
International Airport